Andrey Aleksandrovich Vasilyev (born 27 June 1962) is a Soviet rower.

References 
 
 

1962 births
Living people
Russian male rowers
Soviet male rowers
Rowers at the 1988 Summer Olympics
Olympic silver medalists for the Soviet Union
Olympic rowers of the Soviet Union
Olympic medalists in rowing
World Rowing Championships medalists for the Soviet Union
Medalists at the 1988 Summer Olympics